Two highways in the U.S. state of Nevada have been signed as Route 15:
Interstate 15 in Nevada, part of the Interstate Highway System
Nevada State Route 15 (1929), which existed until the 1970s renumbering